The Dillinger Escape Plan is an EP by American metallic hardcore band The Dillinger Escape Plan, originally released in 1997 and rereleased by Now or Never Records as NoN.02. Some point between the original pressing and the 2000 reissue, it was repressed with different artwork. The repress (likely repressed in 1998) contains an additional keyboard credit for Steve Evetts, as well as correcting the spelling of his name which was misspelled (as Steve Evets) on the original pressing. The original also has the words "It's OK. We'll Just Kill Her Too" on the cover/spine which does not appear on the repress.

In 2000 Now or Never Records reissued the EP with three additional live tracks and new artwork.  On March 25, 2002 Earache released the original EP without the live tracks, but with the new artwork.

Track listing

Personnel
Adam Doll – bass
Dimitri Minakakis – vocals
Chris Pennie – drums, keyboards
Ben Weinman – guitar, keyboards

Addition personnel
Mathew "Matty B" Beckerman – executive producer
Steve Evetts – producer, engineer
Aaron Turner – artwork, design

References

The Dillinger Escape Plan albums
1997 debut EPs
Albums with cover art by Aaron Turner
Albums produced by Steve Evetts